Jonathan is a 1970 West German vampire horror film directed by Hans W. Geißendörfer. The film stars Jürgen Jung, Hans-Dieter Jendreyko, Paul Albert Krumm, Hertha von Walther and Oskar von Schab. The film takes place in the 19th century where vampires who are immune to sunlight have taken over the world. Human rebels band together for a battle of life and the control of civilization.

Release
Jonathan was released on 17 May 1970 in West Germany. Director Hans W. Geißendörfer won the Film Award in Gold at the Deutscher Filmpreis for Best New Direction for his work on Jonathan.

Notes

References

External links 
 

1970 directorial debut films
1970 horror films
1970s historical horror films
Dracula films
Films directed by Hans W. Geißendörfer
Films set in castles
Films set in the 19th century
German historical horror films
1970s German-language films
West German films
1970s German films